Marco Sinigaglia (born 29 February 1968) is a retired Italian football midfielder. He was a squad member for the 1987 FIFA World Youth Championship.

References

1968 births
Living people
Italian footballers
Cagliari Calcio players
Como 1907 players
A.S. Sambenedettese players
Torino F.C. players
A.C. Monza players
A.C. ChievoVerona players
Association football midfielders
Serie A players
Italy youth international footballers